Ollie Brown is a British racing driver currently competing in the British Touring Car Championship. He debuted in 2020 with RCIB Insurance with Fox Transport after briefly racing in the Volkswagen Racing Cup. He is also competing in the GT Cup Championship.

Racing record

Complete GT Cup Championship results
(key) (Races in bold indicate pole position in class – 1 point awarded just in first race; races in italics indicate fastest lap in class – 1 point awarded all races;-

Complete British Touring Car Championship results
(key) (Races in bold indicate pole position – 1 point awarded just in first race) (Races in italics indicate fastest lap – 1 point awarded all races) (* signifies that driver lead race for at least one lap – 1 point given all races)

References

Living people
British Touring Car Championship drivers
English racing drivers
British racing drivers
1983 births